The Monash Whites football team was established in 1964 and is located in Clayton, Victoria, Australia. The club competed under its own name in the Victorian Amateur Football Association up until the 2000 season.  From the 2001 season onwards the club has competed as the "thirds" for the Monash Blues Football Club.

Premierships - 1972 (F Reserve), 1975 (F), 1998 (Club XVIII 2).

Club history
Monash University opened its doors in 1961 and in the University's second year, Monash Blues Football Club entered the Victorian Amateur Football Association (VAFA).

In 1964, the Football Club established a second team, which commenced in the newly created VAFA F Section, a grade that did not require a reserves side.  The original team, by then playing in C Section, played as the Monash Blues whilst the new team took the name Monash Whites.  After only two seasons the Whites went into a five-year hiatus, along with the F Section competition itself.

Monash Blues gained promotion to A Section by 1969 and, "in an effort to expand and field a greater number of teams in order to hold and develop players within the club", the Whites were resurrected by the Monash Blues Football Club in 1971 and returned to  F Section.

After early success, both Monash sides struggled in the late 1970s leading to a split at the end of the 1979 season.

The Whites continued as a stand-alone club until 2000 when it again merged with the Monash Blues Football Club, its original partner. The Whites now play as the Monash Blues' Club XVIII side in the Victorian Amateur Football Association.

In its thirty-two years of competition the Monash Whites participated in fourteen senior finals series, finishing fourth on four occasions, third six times, runners-up twice and champions twice.

External links
 Monash University Whites Football Site
 Monash Blues Football Club Site

References

Victorian Amateur Football Association clubs
University Australian rules football clubs
Australian rules football clubs in Melbourne
1964 establishments in Australia
Monash University
Sport in the City of Monash